Koroshi can refer to:
 Koroshi language, a language of Iran
 "Koroshi" (Danger Man), a 1968 episode of the TV series Danger Man, later released as a feature film
 Koroshi, or Film Noir, a 2000 film by Masahiro Kobayashi

See also 
 
 Kőrösi, a Hungarian surname